Francis Stephen Rogel (December 12, 1927 – June 3, 2002) was an American football fullback for the Pittsburgh Steelers of the NFL.

Collegiate career
Unable to enroll at Penn State due to the college's post-World War II policy of giving admissions priority to returning veterans, Rogel spent the 1946 season playing at the California State Teachers College. Along with other top-tier talent awaiting admission, he helped propel the Vulcans football team to a 9-0-0 record.

Rogel continued on to Penn State, where he was a star fullback and linebacker for three seasons. He was the Nittany Lions' leading rusher each of those seasons and was on the 1948 Cotton Bowl Classic team which tied Southern Methodist, 13-13.

NFL and CFL
Rogel was drafted by the Steelers in the eighth round (#100 overall) in the 1950 NFL Draft, and he did not miss a game his eight seasons with the team (1950–1957).

Rogel's style of play was characterized by "Hey Diddle Diddle, Rogel up the middle" — a popular cheer by Steelers fans. Head coach Walt Kiesling, a conservative-minded coach, started nearly every game by running the same play: "Rogel up the middle." One day, owner Art Rooney suggested to Kiesling to throw it instead. Not wanting to be undermined by Rooney, Kiesling had one of his lineman intentionally go offsides so it could nullify the play. Sure enough, against the rival Cleveland Browns, quarterback Jim Finks threw a touchdown pass that was nullified by the penalty. The following play after the penalty would be "Rogel up the middle."

Rogel was a Pro Bowl selection in 1956. By the time of his retirement following the 1957 season, he was the Steelers' leading career rusher with 3,271 yards. Rogel also played briefly in the Canadian Football League.

In 1959 Rogel was the playing coach of the Sarnia Golden Bears in the semi-pro ORFU. Because of his running style he was nicknamed "twinkle toes".

For eight years during the 1960s, Rogel was head football coach at North Braddock Scott High School and for eight years in the 1970s he was head coach at Highlands High School in Natrona Heights, PA. His teams made one playoff appearance.

Death
Rogel died of Parkinson's disease at age 74 on June 3, 2002, in Richland, Pennsylvania.

References

External links

 
  

1927 births
2002 deaths
People from North Braddock, Pennsylvania
American football linebackers
American football running backs
Players of American football from Pennsylvania
Eastern Conference Pro Bowl players
Hamilton Tiger-Cats players
Penn State Nittany Lions football players
Pittsburgh Steelers players